The Jordanian Ambassador in Beijing is the representative of the government in Amman (Jordan) next the government of the People's Republic of China and is concurrently accredited in Pyongyang.

List of representatives

References 

 
China
Jordan